Nornalupia megacephala is a species of beetle in the family Carabidae, the only species in the genus Nornalupia.

References

Harpalinae
Monotypic Carabidae genera